The 2022 Maspalomas Challenger was a professional tennis tournament played on clay courts. It was the first edition of the tournament which was part of the 2022 ATP Challenger Tour. It took place in Maspalomas, Spain from 28 November to 4 December 2022.

Singles main-draw entrants

Seeds

 1 Rankings are as of 21 November 2022.

Other entrants
The following players received wildcards into the singles main draw:
  Iñaki Cabrera Bello
  Pablo Llamas Ruiz
  Alejandro Moro Cañas

The following player received entry into the singles main draw as an alternate:
  Edoardo Lavagno

The following players received entry from the qualifying draw:
  Andrey Chepelev
  Moez Echargui
  Imanol López Morillo
  Gian Marco Moroni
  David Pérez Sanz
  Eric Vanshelboim

The following player received entry as a lucky loser:
  Rudolf Molleker

Champions

Singles

  Dušan Lajović def.  Steven Diez 6–1, 6–4.

Doubles

  Evan King /  Reese Stalder def.  Marco Bortolotti /  Sergio Martos Gornés 6–3, 5–7, [11–9].

References

2022 ATP Challenger Tour
November 2022 sports events in Spain
December 2022 sports events in Spain